There are no railways in Saint Vincent and the Grenadines.

As of 1996, there were 829 km of highways, of which 580 km are paved.

Ports and harbours:
Kingstown

Merchant marine:
total:
825 ships (1,000 GT or over) totaling 7,253,092 GT/
ships by type:
barge carrier 1, bulk 142, cargo 400, chemical tanker 31, combination bulk 10, combination ore/oil 5, container 47, liquified gas 5, livestock carrier 5, multi-functional large load carrier 3, passenger 3, petroleum tanker 60, refrigerated cargo 41, roll-on/roll-off 51, short-sea passenger 12, specialized tanker 8, vehicle carrier 1 (1999 est.)
note:
a flag of convenience registry; includes ships from 20 countries among which are Croatia 17, Slovenia 7, People's Republic of China 5, Greece 5, United Arab Emirates 3, Norway 2, Japan 2, and Ukraine 2 (1998 est.)

Airports:
6 (2005)

Airports - with paved runways:
total:
5
914 to 1,523 m:
4
under 914 m:
1 (2005)

There is one airport with an unpaved runway, under 914 m (2005 est.)

See also
 Saint Vincent and the Grenadines
 List of airports in Saint Vincent and the Grenadines
 List of airlines of Saint Vincent and the Grenadines

External links
 St. Vincent & the Grenadines Port Authority